Mouans-Sartoux (known in Occitan as Moans e Sartòu or Moans e Sartol) is a commune in the Alpes-Maritimes department in southeastern France. The inhabitants are called Mouansois.
The commune of Sartoux was combined with the commune of Mouans, to take the combined name of Mouans-Sartoux by order of Napoleon III on 28 March 1858.

Population

Politics 
Since 1974, the different mayors have been keen on promoting environment-friendly actions. They notably bought a farm to grow organic vegetables for the school canteens and hired the farmer, which then has a public servant status, a unique fact in France.

See also
Communes of the Alpes-Maritimes department

References

Communes of Alpes-Maritimes
Alpes-Maritimes communes articles needing translation from French Wikipedia